Zalan may refer to:

Places 
 Zalan-e Olya, a village in Iran
 Zălan, a village in Romania
 Zalan, Republic of Buryatia, a rural locality in Russia

Other uses 
 Zalan (duke), 9th-century nobleman
 Zalan FC, South Sudanese football club
 Zalán (given name), a Hungarian name